Shoe Carnival Inc. is an American retailer of family footwear. The company operates 377 stores throughout the midwest, south, and southeast regions. It was founded by David Russell in 1978 and is headquartered in Evansville, Indiana.

The company sells men's, women's, children's, and athletic footwear through its retail stores. Its stores also offer accessories such as handbags, wallets, shoe care items, and socks. The main difference in Shoe Carnival stores is its concept. The Shoe Carnival Concept is creating an urgency to buy through limited time promotions and the microphone. The mic person announces "specials" over the microphone. These specials include discount, product information, and fun specials which encourage customers to make a purchase.

Company history

Establishment

In 1978 the company that was to emerge as Shoe Carnival was established in Evansville, Indiana by founder David Russell, a single shoe store known as Shoe Biz. The store was successful in its local market and by 1986 had expanded to four stores. The Shoe Biz chain attracted the attention of a trio of shoe executives, Jerome "Jack" Fisher, Vince Camuto, and Wayne Weaver of Fisher-Camuto, forerunner of the brand Nine West. A sale was made to the Fisher-Camuto executives, with Russell remaining with his former company as an employee.

Fisher, Camuto, and Weaver unveiled a new retail concept for the chain the following year, rebranding as The Carnival. Expansion continued at a rapid pace, with the company growing to seven stores by the end of 1987.

In 1988 the company moved to the unitary ownership of Wayne Weaver, a former executive with the Wohl division of the St. Louis-based Brown Group, who bought out his associates Fisher and Camuto for just under $20 million. Together with original founder David Russell, Weaver continued on an aggressive expansion path, growing the chain to 39 stores by 1993. An IPO was then tendered, taking the company public on the NASDAQ stock exchange.

Carnival concept and merchandise emphasis

Shoe Carnival built its business by literally adopting a carnival concept, attempting to both entertain and motivate shoppers with loud up-tempo music, microphone operators announcing time-limited promotional offerings, and festive games such as spin-and-win wheels. A brightly painted Shoe Carnival bus and widely publicized grand opening events featuring celebrities and star athletes helped drive shopper enthusiasm for the chain. Confetti and a neon-dominated decor further emphasized the festival atmosphere of shopping at the store.

The company placed significant emphasis on private-label brands through the 1990s, hitting lower price points in competition with such national chains as Payless Shoe Source. This began to change in 1997 when department store veteran Cliff Sifford was added as General Merchandise Manager, with the company consciously attempting to become more "upmarket" through a new emphasis on branded footwear. By the end of 1997 the company had opened its 92nd store.

New approach

In 2002, Shoe Carnival rolled out a new, more subdued logo and toned down the circus-inspired look of its stores.

In 2006 the company began construction on a $40 million corporate headquarters and distribution center. Shoe Carnival's headquarters are now located in a new  building at Cross Pointe Commerce Center on the east side of Evansville. The company's  distribution center was built on Indiana 57 just north of the city.

The company moved to online sales in 2012, by which time 352 stores were in operation, predominantly in the Midwest. In October of that same year, General Merchandise Manager Sifford was promoted to Chief Executive Officer when former CEO Mark Lemond, who had been with the company since 1987, stepped down for health reasons. Mark J. Worden later took over as CEO in September 2021.

Shoe Carnival launched a program called Shoes2U in 2015, allowing shoppers to receive styles and sizes of shoes from other stores in the Shoe Carnival chain through home delivery. Together with further expansion to more than 400 retail stores, this e-commerce initiative lead to the company reaching the $1 billion mark in total sales for the year 2016.

During the first half of fiscal 2018 the company reported $525.8 million in sales, a gain of $37.4 million from the previous year. Sales from comparable stores (omitting internet sales and sales through new stores) increased about 4 percent for that six-month period.

According to Chief Financial Officer Kerry Jackson, speaking to Footwear News in 2018 digital sales were the fastest-growing part of Shoe Carnival's business, with the company making a concerted effort to expand its presence among internet shoppers.

The company's majority owner is J. Wayne Weaver, former owner of the Jacksonville Jaguars.

Acquisition of Shoe Station 
In December 2021, Shoe Carnival announced it had acquired substantially all of the assets of privately held, family-owned Shoe Station, Inc., which operates stores in five Southern states, for $67 million in cash. The addition of a new brand and new retail locations to the Shoe Carnival portfolio creates a retail platform to serve a broader customer base with shoppers in both urban and suburban demographics. Shoe Station's current President and chief executive officer, G. Brent Barkin, becomes the company's Senior Vice President, New Business Development & Integration, reporting to Mr. Worden. Mr. Barkin, the son of Shoe Station's founder Terry S. Barkin, has been with Shoe Station for over twenty years. G. Brent Barkin will lead Shoe Station while focusing on new business growth opportunities for the combined Company. With the addition of Shoe Station to the Shoe Carnival portfolio, the Company expects to surpass 400 stores by the end of 2022, on a path to double-digit new store growth in the years ahead.

Footnotes

External links
Shoe Carnival Website

Companies based in Evansville, Indiana
Shoe companies of the United States
American companies established in 1978
Retail companies established in 1978
1978 establishments in Indiana
Footwear retailers of the United States
Companies listed on the Nasdaq
1993 initial public offerings